Kayl (  or (locally)  ) is a commune and town in south-western Luxembourg. It is part of the canton of Esch-sur-Alzette, which is part of the district of Luxembourg.

, the town of Kayl, which lies in the centre of the commune, has a population of 4,237.  Other towns within the commune include Tétange.

The first surviving written reference to 'Keyle' dates from 1235.   Since the thirteenth century the name of the town has not changed significantly, although more than twenty different spellings have been identified.

The town is the location of the Montenegro honorary consulate in Luxembourg.

Population

References

External links 
 

 
Communes in Esch-sur-Alzette (canton)
Towns in Luxembourg